Sykamino (Greek: Συκάμινο meaning mulberry) is a town and former community of Attica, Greece. Since the 2011 local government reform it is part of the municipality Oropos, of which it is a municipal unit.
Sykamino has historically been an Arvanite settlement.

 
Sykamino is located in the extreme northwestern part of East Attica, on the river Asopos. Sykamino is located east of Thiva and south of Chalkida. The municipal unit has a land area of 15.643 km² and a population of 1,613 inhabitants at the 2011 census. Besides the town of Sykámino (pop. 910), other villages in the municipal unit are Néo Sykámino (pop. 272), Pefkiás (233), Kamári (76), and Katifóri (122).

Historical population

References

External links
GTP Travel Pages (Municipality) (in English and Greek)

Oropos
Populated places in East Attica
Arvanite settlements